Charles Mondry is an American screenwriter, born 1968.

Career
Mondry's recent features include: Play Dirty, an adaptation of Donald Westlake's Parker series about a professional thief, starring Robert Downey, Jr. and directed by Shane Black for Amazon. The screenplay was co-written with Black and Anthony Bagarozzi. A reboot of MGM's Road House, starring Jake Gyllenhaal and directed by Doug Liman; Sony Pictures, Doc Savage, a live-action movie adaptation to be directed by Shane Black and starring Dwayne Johnson, based on the pulp serial novels of the 1930s; Jekyll, a modern-day reimagining of the classic Jekyll and Hyde story based on the BBC mini-series by Steven Moffat and produced by Jeff Kleeman and Ellen DeGeneres for Summit Entertainment and the Cold Warrior, a project Netflix acquired from Universal Pictures in late 2017, which tells the story of a Cold War spy who is forced out of retirement to team with a younger agent to stop a terrorist threat orchestrated by Russia

Mondry became a professional writer when broke into the entertainment industry with a million dollar spec sale. The screenplay, entitled "Tick Tock" (co-written with Anthony Bagarozzi) starred Jennifer Lopez and Samuel Jackson but was cancelled following the attacks on the World Trade Center on September 11, 2001  He is currently co-owner of Modern Pictures, with Anthony Bagarozzi and Randi Nguyen, which produces independently financed features.

References

External links

1968 births
Living people
Place of birth missing (living people)
American male screenwriters